Phalonidia silvestris is a species of moth of the family Tortricidae. It is found in China (Gansu, Heilongjiang, Henan, Hunan, Liaoning, Ningxia), Japan, Korea, Mongolia and Russia.

The wingspan is 14−16 mm.

References

Moths described in 1966
Phalonidia